The following is a list of the Teen Choice Award winners and nominees for Choice Movie Actor - Comedy. Zac Efron has received the most wins with three.

Winners and nominees

2000s

2010s

References

Comedy Actor